Sharn Patrick Gomes (born 6 August 1988) is a South African cricketer. He has played domestic cricket for Western Province and international cricket for Portugal. He is a left-handed batsman and slow left-arm orthodox bowler.

Gomes was born in Cape Town and attended Rondebosch Boys' High School. He played seventeen first-class, six List A, and four Twenty20 games for Western Province between 2010 and 2014. He also played in England for Northamptonshire's second XI.

Gomes represented Portugal in T10 cricket at the 2021 European Cricket Championship, scoring half-centuries against Hungary, Austria, Netherlands XI, and Romania. He was named in Portugal's Twenty20 International (T20I) squad for the 2022 ICC Men's T20 World Cup Europe Qualifier C in Belgium. He made his T20I debut on 29 June 2022, for Portugal against Malta.

References

Living people
1988 births
South African cricketers
Portuguese cricketers
Western Province cricketers
South African people of Portuguese descent
Sportspeople from Cape Town
Portugal Twenty20 International cricketers